Volvo Cars Recharge is the overarching range name for all cars by Volvo with any form of electric charging system, including both fully electric and plug in hybrid powertrains. The Recharge nameplate appears on the rear-side columns of the cars in the same way as the Momentum, R Design, and Inscription trim ranges are marked.

Volvo Cars intends to launch a fully electric car every year, with the aim of such cars comprising half of its global sales by 2025; the other half will be hybrids. The models of the Volvo C40, XC40, XC60, S60, V60, XC90, S90 and V90 all have one option of Recharge available.

In 2021, Volvo announced upgraded powertrains for their Recharge range. This new change is reflected in their 60- and 90-series models.

XC40 Recharge

The model XC40 Recharge is Volvo's first all-electric car. The design is largely based on the existing internal combustion engine powered XC40 but with the removal of the traditional front grille and the tailpipe. Autocar conduced a test drive in October 2020.

The car is powered by a battery pack supplied by either LG Chem or CATL, depending on the factory in which the car is made. The battery can charge to 80% of its capacity in 40 minutes on a fast charger. The battery pack is placed in the floor of the car, and encased in an aluminium safety cage that creates a crumple zone around the battery.

The XC40 Recharge contains an infotainment system, which was created in collaboration with Google. The native Android system features apps including Google Assistant, Google Maps and the Google Play Store. The system can be fully voice controlled and receives continuous, real-time software and operating system updates.

See also
 Volvo C30 DRIVe Electric
 Volvo V70 Plug in Hybrid (demonstrator)

References

External links
Article in Verge magazine. Hawkins, Andrew J. Retrieved 25.10.19 
Article in Design Milk magazine. Han, Gregory. Retrieved 25.10.19
 Volvo Cars to radically reduce carbon emissions as part of new ambitious climate plan 
Volvo Cars official homepage
Volvo Cars Official Recharged homepage

Recharge
Plug-in hybrid vehicles
Electric concept cars
Vehicles with wheel motors